This is a list of 110 species in Podabrus, a genus of soldier beetles in the family Cantharidae.

Podabrus species

 Podabrus alexanderi Fender, 1953 i g
 Podabrus alpinus (Paykull, 1798) g
 Podabrus altus Fall, 1928 i g
 Podabrus ambiguus Fall, 1928 i g
 Podabrus appendiculatus Fall, 1928 i g b
 Podabrus basilaris (Say, 1823) i g
 Podabrus basillaris  b
 Podabrus binotatus LeConte, 1881 i g
 Podabrus bolteri LeConte, 1881 i g
 Podabrus brevicollis Fall, 1928 i g b
 Podabrus brevipennis LeConte, 1878 i g
 Podabrus brimleyi Green, 1947 i g b
 Podabrus brunneus Fender, 1943 i g
 Podabrus brunnicollis (Fabricius, 1801) i g b
 Podabrus californicus Fender, 1948 i g
 Podabrus carmelensis Fender, 1948 i g
 Podabrus cascadensis Fender, 1943 i g b
 Podabrus cavicollis LeConte, 1851 i g b
 Podabrus cinctipennis LeConte, 1866 i
 Podabrus citrinus Fall, 1928 i g
 Podabrus confraternus Fall, 1928 i g
 Podabrus conspiratus Fall, 1926 i g b
 Podabrus corneus LeConte, 1861 i g
 Podabrus danielsi Fender, 1943 i g
 Podabrus deceptus Brown, 1940 i
 Podabrus diadema (Fabricius, 1798) i g b
 Podabrus dietrichi Green, 1947 i g
 Podabrus dreisbachi Green, 1948 i g b
 Podabrus edmundsae Fender, 1953 i g b
 Podabrus excursus Fall, 1928 i g
 Podabrus extremus LeConte, 1881 i
 Podabrus extricatus Fall, 1928 i g
 Podabrus falli Hopping, 1929 i g b
 Podabrus fayi LeConte, 1866 i g b
 Podabrus fenestratus Fall, 1928 i g
 Podabrus fissilis Fall, 1926 i
 Podabrus fissus LeConte, 1881 i g
 Podabrus flavicollis LeConte, 1851 i g b
 Podabrus frater LeConte, 1851 i g b
 Podabrus frosti Fender, 1946 i g
 Podabrus fulvus Fall, 1928 i g
 Podabrus fumiganus Green, 1948 i
 Podabrus furtivus Fall, 1928 i
 Podabrus gracilis Fall, 1928 i g
 Podabrus hackerae Fender in Hatch, 1962 i
 Podabrus heteronychus Fall, 1928 i
 Podabrus illex Fall, 1928 i g
 Podabrus infumatus Green, 1949 i g
 Podabrus instabilis Fall, 1928 i
 Podabrus intrusus Green, 1947 i g b
 Podabrus knobeli Fall, 1928 i g
 Podabrus knowltoni Fender, 1948 i g
 Podabrus laevicollis (Kirby in Richards, 1837) i
 Podabrus lapponicus (Gyllenhal, 1810) g
 Podabrus lateralis LeConte in Wheeler, 1876 i g
 Podabrus latimanus (Motschulsky, 1860) i g b
 Podabrus limatus Fall, 1928 i g
 Podabrus limbellus LeConte, 1881 i
 Podabrus longicornis Fall, 1928 i g
 Podabrus lucidatus Fender, 1948 i g
 Podabrus lutosus LeConte, 1881 i
 Podabrus lygarius Fender in Hatch, 1962 i
 Podabrus macer LeConte, 1861 i
 Podabrus malheurensis Fender in Hatch, 1962 i g
 Podabrus mellitus LeConte, 1881 i g
 Podabrus melvillei Fender in Hatch, 1962 i
 Podabrus modestus (Say, 1823) i g b
 Podabrus modulatus Fall, 1928 i g
 Podabrus moestus Fall, 1928 i g
 Podabrus muliebris Fall, 1928 i g
 Podabrus nothoides LeConte, 1881 i g b
 Podabrus obscurevittatus Fall, 1928 i
 Podabrus obscuripes J.Sahlberg, 1871 g
 Podabrus occipitalis Fall, 1928 i g
 Podabrus ochocensis Fender, 1953 i
 Podabrus pattoni LeConte, 1866 i
 Podabrus perplexus Brown, 1940 i
 Podabrus piceatus Fender, 1953 i
 Podabrus piniphilus (Eschscholtz, 1830) i
 Podabrus planulus Green, 1947 i g b
 Podabrus probus Fall, 1928 i
 Podabrus protensus LeConte, 1866 i g b
 Podabrus pruinosus LeConte, 1851 i b  (downy leather-winged beetle)
 Podabrus puberulus LeConte in Agassiz, 1850 i
 Podabrus punctatus LeConte in Agassiz, 1850 i
 Podabrus puncticollis (Kirby in Richards, 1837) i
 Podabrus punctulatus LeConte, 1859 i g b
 Podabrus pustulatus Fender in Hatch, 1962 i
 Podabrus pygmaeus Green, 1948 i g b
 Podabrus quadratus LeConte, 1881 i g
 Podabrus rossi Fender, 1948 i
 Podabrus rugosulus LeConte in Agassiz, 1850 i g b
 Podabrus scaber LeConte, 1861 i
 Podabrus schuhi Fender in Hatch, 1962 i g
 Podabrus secretus Brown, 1940 i
 Podabrus sericatus (Mannerheim, 1846) i g
 Podabrus sierrae Fall, 1928 i g
 Podabrus simplex Couper, 1865 i
 Podabrus smithi Fender, 1948 i
 Podabrus stehri Miskimen, 1956 i g
 Podabrus tejonicus LeConte, 1859 i g
 Podabrus tenuis Fall, 1928 i g
 Podabrus tetragonoderus Fall, 1926 i b
 Podabrus tomentosus (Say, 1825) i g b
 Podabrus tricostatus (Say, 1835) i g b
 Podabrus vandykei Fender, 1949 i g
 Podabrus vernalis Green, 1948 i g b
 Podabrus viduus Fall, 1928 i g
 Podabrus xanthoderus LeConte, 1881 i g
 Podabrus youngi Fender, 1979 i g

Data sources: i = ITIS, c = Catalogue of Life, g = GBIF, b = Bugguide.net

References

Articles created by Qbugbot
Podabrus